Andrew Weston Clarke (born 22 July 1967) is an English former footballer. A striker, he scored 74 goals in 410 league games in a 14-year career in the English Football League.

After helping Barnet to the Conference title in 1990–91, he was signed to Wimbledon, a Football League side, at the relatively late age of 23. He played for the "Dons" in the Premier League, before being loaned out to Port Vale in 1998 and Northampton Town in 1999. He joined Peterborough United in June 1999, and scored the only goal of the Third Division play-off final in 2000. He retired in May 2005.

Career

Barnet
Clarke originally started playing Sunday League football in the Greek Community League, before moving on to Islington St Mary's in the Spartan League. He was signed to Barnet by manager Barry Fry. He scored on his debut for the "Bees" in a 5–1 defeat at Sutton United on 6 May 1989. He made a huge impression at Underhill over the next eighteen months, and was named as the club's Player of the Year for 1990. He also represented the England Non-League XI before signing for Ray Harford's Wimbledon in February 1991 for £250,000 – a record fee for a non-league player. At the end of the season, Barry Fry led the "Bees" to promotion to the Football League as champions of the Conference.

Wimbledon
Clarke was immediately thrown into the first team at Plough Lane, playing 12 league games and scoring three goals as the "Dons" finished seventh in the First Division. New boss Joe Kinnear then led the club to a 13th-place finish in 1991–92. The club then became founder members of the Premier League, posting a 12th-place finish in 1992–93; Clarke scored five goals in 33 appearances. Despite being forced to play their home games at Crystal Palace's Selhurst Park, they rose to sixth in 1993–94, finishing higher than all London clubs except Arsenal. Wimbledon then finished ninth in 1994–95 and Clarke won the BBC Goal of the Month award for February with his goal against Liverpool at Anfield in the FA Cup fifth round. He scored four goals in 1995–96, helping the "Wombles" into 14th place. Clarke hit the net just once in 1996–97 as the "Crazy Gang" hit eighth in the league, and reached the semi-finals of both domestic cup competitions. He played 20 games in 1997–98, again scoring just one goal, as Wimbledon dropped to 15th. In total he played 212 league and cup games for the club, scoring 23 goals. Clarke started the 1998–99 campaign on loan at First Division side Port Vale, but made just six goalless appearances for John Rudge's "Valiants". He spent four weeks on loan at Second Division side Northampton Town in January 1999, but made just four goalless appearances for the struggling Sixfields side.

Peterborough United
He was given a free transfer in June 1999, and joined Third Division club Peterborough United. He rediscovered his scoring form at London Road under Barry Fry, his former manager at Barnet, bagging 18 goals in 43 appearances in 1999–2000. The "Posh" finished fifth, and Clarke scored at Underhill in a 5–1 win over Barnet in the play-off semi-finals. He went on to score in the play-off Final at Wembley, the only goal of the game, to take Peterborough into the Second Division; he said that "It's the best moment of my life." Clarke hit 11 goals in 48 games in 2000–01, helping Peterborough to acclimatise well to the third tier. In December 2001 he failed a random drugs test – the results being released in February the following year. Accepting his explanation that it was a 'one-off' he was given a four-week ban. He quickly signed a new contract with the club in April 2002, and returned to the first team. On the field, he hit eight goals in 37 games in 2001–02. Scoring 19 goals in 48 games, he described the 2002–03 season as his "best ever". He scored 12 goals in 50 games in 2003–04, helping Peterborough to avoid relegation by three places and two points. In May 2004 the 36-year-old put pen to paper on a new one-year contract. He remained popular throughout his time at Peterborough, even though he only scored three goals in 37 appearances in the 2004–05 relegation campaign, before being released in May 2005. In all he scored 73 goals in 266 appearances in all competitions for Peterborough.

Post-retirement
After retiring, he worked on a market stall in the centre of Barnet.

Career statistics
Source:

Honours
Individual
Barnet F.C. Player of the Year: 1990

Barnet
Conference National: 1990–91

Peterborough United
Football League Third Division play-offs: 2000

References

1967 births
Living people
Footballers from Islington (district)
English footballers
England semi-pro international footballers
Black British sportsmen
Association football forwards
Barnet F.C. players
Wimbledon F.C. players
Port Vale F.C. players
Northampton Town F.C. players
Peterborough United F.C. players
National League (English football) players
English Football League players
Premier League players